Carajás Esporte Clube, or Carajás, as they are usually called, is a Brazilian football team from Parauapebas in Pará, founded on June 27, 1997.

History
Founded in 1997, Carajás has two titles from the Campeonato Paraense Second Division. In 2007, it signed a partnership with Paysandu, receiving players from the base to gain experience. In exchange, it changed its name to Time Negra Carajás, and its colors happened to be the black and the white. But after years, the team was once again called Carajás and its colors were once again orange, white and black.

Honours
 Campeonato Paraense Second Division: 2
1999, 2013

External links
 Official Site

Association football clubs established in 1997
Carajás
1997 establishments in Brazil